Diamond mine may refer to:

 Diamond mine
 Diamond Mine (Blue Rodeo album), 1989
 Diamond Mine (King Creosote and Jon Hopkins album), 2011
 Diamond Mine (video game), a 1980s home computer game
 Diamond Mine, a 2000 game from PopCap Games, now Bejeweled
 The Diamond Mine (album), a 2005 mixtape from Diamond D
 "The Diamond Mine" (short story), a short story by Willa Cather
Diamond Mine (professional wrestling), a professional wrestling stable led by Roderick Strong and Malcolm Bivens and consists of Brutus Creed, Julius Creed, Ivy Nile and Tatum Paxley. Tyler Rust and Hachiman were former members